The Right Honourable Henry Francis Cecil Vane, 12th Baron Barnard MBA BSc (born 11 March 1959), known as Harry Vane, is a British landowner and nobleman. He inherited his title in 2016 when his father died.

Background and early life
Vane is the son of the 11th Baron Barnard and Lady Davina Mary, née Cecil, the eldest daughter of David Cecil, 6th Marquess of Exeter, the Olympic gold medallist who inspired the character of Lord Andrew Lindsay in the film Chariots of Fire (1981). 

Princess Alice, Duchess of Gloucester was one of the sponsors at his baptism. He was educated at Eton College and the University of Edinburgh, from which he holds a Bachelor of Science degree, and Durham University, where he took an MBA.

He lives and works in County Durham. He owns the Raby Estates and castle, and other properties.

He is Honorary President of Teesdale & Weardale Search & Mountain Rescue Team.

Family
On 12 December 1998, Vane married Lydia Katherine (Kate) Robson, the daughter of Christopher Robson of Rudd Hall, Richmond, Yorkshire. They have three children, two daughters and a son:

 Cicely Margaret Vane (born 20 June 2000)
 Alice Isabella Vane (born 16 October 2001)
 William Henry Cecil Vane (born 4 June 2005)

References

External links
Raby Estates

Barnard, Henry Francis Cecil Vane, 12th Baron
Barnard, Henry Francis Cecil Vane, 12th Baron
Barnard, Henry Francis Cecil Vane, 12th Baron
Barnard, Henry Francis Cecil Vane, 12th Baron
Barnard, Henry Francis Cecil Vane, 12th Baron
Alumni of Durham University Graduate Society